Battery Park is an unincorporated community in Isle of Wight County, Virginia, United States. Battery Park has a post office with ZIP code 23304, which opened on December 28, 1892.

References

Unincorporated communities in Isle of Wight County, Virginia